Harrison Township is a township in Mercer County, in the U.S. state of Missouri.

Harrison Township was established in 1843, and most likely named in honor of William Henry Harrison, 9th President of the United States.

References

Townships in Missouri
Townships in Mercer County, Missouri